Eerikki Koivu (born 29 December 1979 in Kokkola, Finland) is a professional ice hockey defenceman who is currently playing for Lørenskog IK in Norway's GET-ligaen.

Career
Until 2004, Koivu had played two seasons in Ligue Magnus and the rest of his career in Mestis, the second tier of Finnish hockey. In the 2004–05 season, he played his first five games in SM-liiga with JYP and continued in the team for 2005-06 and 2006–07 seasons. He moved to Norway in 2007 to play with Lørenskog IK.

After playing four seasons in Norway, he received eligibility to play for the Norwegian national team, and he was selected to play at the 2011 IIHF World Championship.

External links

1979 births
Living people
People from Kokkola
Norwegian ice hockey players
Finnish ice hockey defencemen
Finnish expatriate ice hockey players in France
Ducs d'Angers players
Hokki players
JYP Jyväskylä players
Lørenskog IK players
Storhamar Dragons players
Sportspeople from Central Ostrobothnia